Tass Mourdoukoutas (born 3 March 1999) is an Australian professional soccer player who plays as a defender for Canadian Premier League club York United.

Early life
Born in Sydney, Mourdoukoutas grew up in Sylvania Waters and is of Greek descent. He began playing soccer at the age of four with the Marrickville FC Red Devils. Afterwards, he joined the Football NSW Institute before moving to Sydney Olympic's youth team in 2016. In 2017, he joined the Western Sydney Wanderers Academy, where he played for both the club’s National Premier Leagues NSW 2 side and Championship-winning Foxtel Y-League team.

Career

Western Sydney Wanderers
Mourdoukoutas made his professional debut for Western Sydney Wanderers in a 1–1 draw with Wellington Phoenix on 13 January 2018, coming on for Steven Lustica in the 88th minute. He signed his first professional contract with the Wanderers on 8 June 2018, penning a two-year deal with the club. Mourdoukoutas scored his first professional goal in a Round 15 clash with Melbourne City on 23 January 2019, scoring the Wanderers' second as they went on to lose 4–3. In February 2020, he signed a three year extension with the club. On 16 June 2022, it was announced that he would be departing the club.

York United
On 24 June 2022, Mourdoukoutas signed with Canadian Premier League side York United through 2023. He made his debut for York on July 8, against Forge FC.

International career
In August 2018, he was named to the Australia U19 team for the 2018 AFC U-19 Championship.

In 2019, he played with the Australia U23 at the 2020 AFC U-23 Championship qualification tournament and later at the 2020 AFC U-23 Championship, helping Australia to a third place finish to qualify for the Olympics, although Mourdoukoutas was not selected for the Olympic squad.

Honours
Western Sydney Wanderers
Y-League: 2017–18

References

External links

1999 births
Living people
Australian soccer players
Australia youth international soccer players
Australian people of Greek descent
Association football defenders
Australian expatriate soccer players
Expatriate soccer players in Canada
Australian expatriate sportspeople in Canada
Sydney Olympic FC players
Western Sydney Wanderers FC players
York United FC players
National Premier Leagues players
A-League Men players